David Gary Hettema (born November 7, 1942) is a former American football tackle who played college football for New Mexico (1962–1965) and professional football in the National Football League (NFL) for the San Francisco 49ers in 1967 and the Atlanta Falcons in 1970.

Early years
Hettema was born in 1942 in Pasadena, California, and attended Pasadena School. He played college football for the New Mexico Lobos from 1962 to 1965.

Professional football
He was drafted by the San Francisco 49ers in the 16th round (212th overall pick) of the 1965 NFL Draft. He signed with the 49ers in December 1965, receiving a $10,000 bonus. He played for the 49ers' taxi squad in 1966 and appeared in seven games for the club during the 1967 season. 

He also played for the Atlanta Falcons during the 1969 and 1970 seasons. He sustained an injury in a preseason game in 1969 that caused him to miss the season. In 1970, he appeared in six games for the Falcons. He was released by the Falcons in September 1971.

He also played for the San Jose Apaches of the Continental Football League in 1967.

References

1942 births
Living people
American football tackles
San Francisco 49ers players
Atlanta Falcons players
New Mexico Lobos football players
Players of American football from Pasadena, California
Continental Football League players